George Lowe (born 1958) is an American comedian and voice actor.

George Lowe may also refer to:

George Lowe (baseball) (1895–1981), American Major League pitcher
George Lowe (cricketer, born 1915) (1915–2008), English cricketer
George Lowe (cricketer, born 1878) (1878–1932), English cricketer
George Lowe (New Zealand cricketer) (1847-1922), New Zealand cricketer
George Lowe (mountaineer) (1924–2013), New Zealand-born mountaineer
George Lowe (rugby union) (born 1989), English rugby union player
George Lowe (MP) (c. 1594–1682), English politician
George Lowe (American alpinist) (born 1944), American alpinist
Bulger Lowe (1895–1939), American football player, coach, and official

See also
George Low (disambiguation)